"Metaphors of a Magnifico" is a poem from Wallace Stevens's first book of poetry, Harmonium (1923). It was first published in 1918, so it is in the public domain. The poem experiments with perspective.

It explores the difference between detached reportage in its various foci: twenty men, a single bridge, a village; 
twenty villages; or one man, one bridge, one village, on one hand and immediate lived experience – the boots, the boards, the first
white wall of the village rising through the first fruit trees on the other. Stevens' preference for immediate lived experience addressed in his scornful treatment of William Carlos Williams in "Nuances of a Theme by Williams", is what commentators have in mind when they
speak of his sensualism. Magnifico may be one of those men crossing
the bridge, shifting from viewing himself and the world from various
external perspectives to the first-person viewpoint ("Of what was it I
was thinking"?). What explicitly will not declare itself is subjective experience, and yet it declares itself through the action of the poem. The meanings that enable objective description of the world do not declare
themselves, and yet the poem ends with them in a reduction that is an usurpation of the subjective.

Buttel cites the poem to support his claim that Stevens has the Cubists' ability to see different perspectives of an object simultaneously: "One must assimilate the multiplicity here", he writes about the various bridge crossings, "just as the viewer of Duchamp's painting must assimilate the fragmentation and multiplicity of the nude descending the staircase".

See also his poems "The Snow Man" and "Gubbinal" for related experiments in perspective.

Notes

References 
 Buttel, H. Wallace Stevens: The Making of Harmonium. 1967: Princeton University Press.

1918 poems
American poems
Poetry by Wallace Stevens